Trevor Exton (born 8 November 1981) is a Papua New Guinean rugby league footballer, who played for the Sheffield Eagles in England. He played for the Ipswich Jets in 2008.

He was named in the PNG squad for the 2008 Rugby League World Cup, and he played in all three of Papua New Guinea's matches.

In 2012 Exton signed with the Mackay Cutters.

References

External links
 Ipswich Jets profile

1981 births
Living people
Australian people of Papua New Guinean descent
Ipswich Jets players
Mackay Cutters players
Papua New Guinea national rugby league team players
Papua New Guinean rugby league players
Papua New Guinean sportsmen
Rugby league props
Rugby league second-rows
Sheffield Eagles players